"Love Is an Animal" is the fourth single from Australian singer-songwriter Wes Carr's second studio album, The Way the World Looks. It was sent to radio on 27 August 2009 and released physically on 18 September 2009.

Charts
The song was the second most-added track to the radio in its debut week of release

References

2009 singles
Wes Carr songs
2009 songs
Sony BMG singles
Songs written by Wes Carr